Robert M. Shoemaker High School is a public high school located in Killeen, Texas (USA) and classified as a 6A school by the UIL. It is one of four high schools in the Killeen Independent School District located in western Bell County. In 2015, the school was rated "Met Standard" by the Texas Education Agency.

Athletics
The Shoemaker Grey Wolves compete in the following sports - 

Baseball
Basketball
Cross Country
Dancing
Football
Golf
Soccer
Softball
Swimming
Tennis
Track and Field
Volleyball
Wrestling

Notable alumni
 Roy Miller, American football player
 Jameill Showers, American football player
 Brother Nature, social media influencer

References

External links
Killeen ISD

High schools in Bell County, Texas
Killeen Independent School District high schools